KWUF may refer to:

 KWUF (AM), a radio station (1400 AM) licensed to Pagosa Springs, Colorado, United States
 KWUF-FM, a radio station (106.1 FM) licensed to Pagosa Springs, Colorado